Albania sent at least one athlete to compete at the 2007 World Championships in Athletics. Dorian Collaku failed to qualify for the final round of the Hammer Throw despite throwing his season's best 68.30 m.  He finished 27th overall.  Additionally, Klodiana Shala was on the provisional entry list but did not record a finish in the 400-m women's run.

Competitors

References 

Nations at the 2007 World Championships in Athletics
World Championships in Athletics
2007